Rajendra Kumar Maurya is an Indian politician and a member of Uttar Pradesh Legislative Assembly from Pratapgarh Assembly constituency of Uttar Pradesh. He was elected from this constituency in 2022 Uttar Pradesh Legislative Assembly elections, as a candidate of Bhartiya Janata Party.

References

Bharatiya Janata Party politicians from Uttar Pradesh
Uttar Pradesh MLAs 2022–2027
Year of birth missing (living people)
Living people